Alberta Kinsey (1875 - April 23, 1952) was an American painter. Born in West Milton, Ohio, she was trained in New Orleans, France and Italy. She taught at Wilmington College and became an artist in New Orleans' French Quarter. Her work can be seen at the Smithsonian American Art Museum.

References

1875 births
1952 deaths
American women painters
Artists from New Orleans
Painters from Ohio
People from West Milton, Ohio
20th-century American painters
20th-century American women artists
Public Works of Art Project artists